David Nkumu Mbala (born 19 April 1993, in Kinshasa) is a Congolese professional footballer who plays as a forward.

Football career
On 29 July 2012, Mbala made his professional debut with Penafiel in a 2012–13 Taça da Liga match against Feirense—when he started and played the full game. In the first match of the 2012–13 Segunda Liga season against Atlético on 12 August 2012, he scored his first professional goal (93rd minute) in his league debut.
On 27 December 2016, Primeira Liga side Boavista announced the signing of the Congolese international player, reuniting him with Miguel Leal, his former coach at Penafiel who guided the team in their successful 2013-14 Segunda Liga campaign, which ended with the Penafiel side achieving promotion to Primeira Liga. He was there for 6 months and signed for Moldovan side Zaria Bălți, for whom he was with for 1 season.

References

External links

Stats and profile at LPFP

1993 births
Living people
Democratic Republic of the Congo footballers
Democratic Republic of the Congo international footballers
Association football forwards
F.C. Penafiel players
Boavista F.C. players
CSF Bălți players
Liga Portugal 2 players
Primeira Liga players
Moldovan Super Liga players
Democratic Republic of the Congo expatriate footballers
Expatriate footballers in Portugal
Democratic Republic of the Congo expatriate sportspeople in Portugal
Expatriate footballers in Moldova
Democratic Republic of the Congo expatriate sportspeople in Moldova
21st-century Democratic Republic of the Congo people